Kytheros or Cytherus may refer to:

Kytheros, a River-God of ancient Elis in West Peloponnesos
Kytheros (deme), an ancient Athenian deme

See also
 Kythera